General Crozier may refer to:

General Crozier (character), a fictional character in the animated television show Metalocalypse
Baptist Crozier (1878–1957), British Army major general
Frank Percy Crozier (1879–1937), British Army brigadier general
William Crozier (artillerist) (1855–1942), U.S. Army major general and artillerist